The 2014 Mersin Cup was a professional tennis tournament played on clay courts. It was the third edition of the tournament which was part of the 2014 ATP Challenger Tour. It took place in Mersin, Turkey between 7 and 13 April 2014.

Singles main-draw entrants

Seeds

Other entrants
The following players received wildcards into the singles main draw:
  Anıl Yüksel
  Barış Ergüden
  Cem İlkel
  Tuna Altuna

The following players received entry from the qualifying draw:
  Nicolas Reissig
  Philipp Davydenko
  Michael Linzer
  Claudio Fortuna

Doubles main-draw entrants

Seeds

Other entrants
The following pairs received wildcards into the doubles main draw:
  Marsel İlhan /  Cem İlkel 
  Anıl Yüksel /  Efe Yurtaçan
  Tuna Altuna /  Barış Ergüden

Champions

Singles

 Damir Džumhur def.  Pere Riba, 7–6(7–4), 6–3

Doubles

 Radu Albot /  Jaroslav Pospíšil def.  Thomas Fabbiano /  Matteo Viola, 7–6(9–7), 6–1

External links
Official Website

Mersin Cup
Mersin Cup